"Lonely in Gorgeous" is the eighth single released by Tomoko Kawase under the name Tommy february6, and the last single released before her four-year hiatus. "Lonely in Gorgeous" is the opening song for the anime Paradise Kiss. It was released on November 30, 2005, and peaked at #20 in Japan and stayed on the charts for three weeks.

Track listing

Music video

References

External links 
 Tommy february6 Official Site

2005 singles
2005 songs
Tomoko Kawase songs
Defstar Records singles
Anime songs
Songs written by Tomoko Kawase
Songs written by Shunsaku Okuda